Maiza Hameed Gujjar (Punjabi) is a Pakistani politician and active political worker of Nawaz Sharif who has been a member of the National Assembly of Pakistan, since August 2018. Previously she was a member of the National Assembly from June 2013 to May 2018 and a member of the Provincial Assembly of the Punjab from 2008 to 2013.

Political career
Maiza Hameed was elected to the Provincial Assembly of the Punjab as a candidate of Pakistan Muslim League (N) (PML-N) on a reserved seat for women in the 2008 Pakistani general election.

She was elected to the National Assembly of Pakistan as a candidate of PML-N on a reserved seat for women from Punjab in the 2013 general election. In January 2017, she was appointed as the Federal Parliamentary Secretary for Capital Administration and Development Division.

She was re-elected to the National Assembly as a candidate of PML-N on a seat reserved for women from Punjab in the 2018 Pakistani general election. Following her election, Pakistan Tehreek-e-Insaf (PTI) filed a petition in the Islamabad High Court to challenge her election.

References

Living people
Pakistan Muslim League (N) MPAs (Punjab)
Pakistan Muslim League (N) MNAs
Pakistani MNAs 2013–2018
Punjabi people
Punjabi women
Women members of the National Assembly of Pakistan
Year of birth missing (living people)
Punjab MPAs 2008–2013
Women members of the Provincial Assembly of the Punjab
Pakistani MNAs 2018–2023
21st-century Pakistani women politicians